Jean Toffey Ekonian (1935 – 3 October 2012) was an Ivorian middle-distance runner. He competed in the men's 3000 metres steeplechase at the 1964 Summer Olympics.

References

External links
 

1935 births
2012 deaths
Athletes (track and field) at the 1964 Summer Olympics
Ivorian male middle-distance runners
Ivorian male steeplechase runners
Olympic athletes of Ivory Coast
Place of birth missing